Sarji is a surname in many Middle Eastern countries.

It is also thought to be the name of an unguided missile production facility in Iran.

References

Surnames